Mihr-Mihroe (died 555), in Middle Persian either Mihr-Mihrōē or Mihrmāh-rōy; in Byzantine sources Mermeroes, was a 6th-century Sasanian general, and one of the leading commanders of the Byzantine–Sassanid Wars of the time.

Biography
Nothing is known of his early life, but Mihr-Mihroe is recorded as an old man by 555. He first appears in summer 530, during the Iberian War, when he led an army of 30,000 in an invasion of Byzantium's Armenian provinces. However, he was defeated near Satala by the Byzantine generals Sittas and Dorotheus and had to withdraw. In summer 531, following the narrow Persian victory at Callinicum and a series of minor reversals in Armenia and northern Mesopotamia, the Persian shah, Kavadh I (r. 488–531), sent Mihr-Mihroe along with Bawi and Kanarang to capture the Byzantine stronghold of Martyropolis. The two commanders laid siege to the city, but after receiving news of Kavadh's death, and with their troops suffering from the cold winter, they concluded a truce and withdrew to Persian territory.

In 542, after the renewal of hostilities in 540, Mihr-Mihroe was dispatched by Khosrau I (r. 531–579) against the Byzantine fortress of Dara, but, according to Corippus, he was defeated and captured by the fort's commander, John Troglita. Mihr-Mihroe reappears in 548, when he was sent at the head of a large army to relieve the fortress of Petra in Lazica, which was under siege by a combined Byzantine-Lazic force. As the Byzantine commander, Dagisthaeus, had neglected to safeguard the mountain passes with sufficient men, Mihr-Mihroe was able to move into Lazica, brushing aside the Byzantine detachments. He relieved the siege of Petra and reinforced its garrison, but lacking supplies for his army, he was forced to withdraw to Dvin in Persian Armenia, leaving behind some 3,000 men garrisoning Petra and a further 5,000 under Phabrizus to keep the supply route open.

Phabrizus was attacked in the next year by the Lazi and the Byzantines, but the Persians somehow managed to resupply Petra. The new Byzantine commander, Bessas, laid siege to Petra. In spring 551, Mihr-Mihroe marched with an army of cavalry and eight elephants to relieve the fortress once again, but before he could do this, it fell to Bessas's troops, who dismantled the city walls. He then turned towards the Lazic capital, Archaeopolis, seizing the forts of Sarapanis and Scanda in the process. He laid siege to Archaeopolis, but his attacks were repulsed. As his army suffered from lack of supplies, he was forced to abandon the siege and head west, to the fertile province of Mocheresis, which he made his base of operations. Over the subsequent winter of 551/552, he strengthened his control over eastern Lazica (including the region of Suania), while his peace overtures to the Lazic king Gubazes II (r. 541–555) failed. Reinforced with mercenaries recruited among the Sabirs, in 552 he attacked the Byzantine-Lazic strongholds of Archaeopolis, Tzibile, and a third unnamed fort, but was again repulsed and withdrew to Mocheresis.

In 554 news spread about him being critically ill. However, he launched an attack and dislodged a superior Byzantine force from Telephis, their most forward position, causing a general retreat along the Phasis river. He did not pursue them, however, or otherwise press his advantage, due to his own army's lack of supplies and siege equipments. After strengthening his own forts including Onoguris, he returned to Mocheresis. There he fell ill, and withdrew to Iberia; he died of his illness at Mtskheta in the summer of 555. Agathias has described his exotic burial, a sky burial that was according to the Zoroastrian orthodoxy (see dakhma).

He was old, lame, and unable to ride, but brave, experienced, and "energetic as a youth".

 

After his death, Nachoragan succeeded him in his command.

References

Sources

5th-century births
554 deaths
6th-century Iranian people
Lazic War
People of the Roman–Sasanian Wars
Generals of Khosrow I
Iberian War
Generals of Kavad I